Tuman Rahi (also Romanized as Tūmān Rāhī; also known as Tombān Rāhī and Tūmānzāhī) is a village in Sirik Rural District, Byaban District, Minab County, Hormozgan Province, Iran. At the 2006 census, its population was 130, in 22 families.

References 

Populated places in Minab County